The ancient Egyptian units of measurement are those used by the dynasties of ancient Egypt prior to its incorporation in the Roman Empire and general adoption of Roman, Greek, and Byzantine units of measurement. The units of length seem to have originally been anthropic, based on various parts of the human body, although these were standardized using cubit rods, strands of rope, and official measures maintained at some temples.

Following Alexander the Great's conquest of Persia and subsequent death, his bodyguard and successor Ptolemy assumed control in Egypt, partially reforming its measurements, introducing some new units and hellenized names for others.

Length
Egyptian units of length are attested from the Early Dynastic Period. Although it dates to the 5th dynasty, the Palermo stone recorded the level of the Nile River during the reign of the Early Dynastic pharaoh Djer, when the height of the Nile was recorded as 6 cubits and 1 palm (about ). A Third Dynasty diagram shows how to construct an elliptical vault using simple measures along an arc. The ostracon depicting this diagram was found near the Step Pyramid of Saqqara. A curve is divided into five sections and the height of the curve is given in cubits, palms, and digits in each of the sections.

At some point, lengths were standardized by cubit rods. Examples have been found in the tombs of officials, noting lengths up to remen. Royal cubits were used for land measures such as roads and fields. Fourteen rods, including one double-cubit rod, were described and compared by Lepsius. Two examples are known from the Saqqara tomb of Maya, the treasurer of Tutankhamun. Another was found in the tomb of Kha (TT8) in Thebes. The rules are also divided into hands so that for example one foot is given as three hands and fifteen fingers and also as four palms and sixteen fingers.

Surveying and itinerant measurement were undertaken using rods, poles, and knotted cords of rope. A scene in the tomb of Menna in Thebes shows surveyors measuring a plot of land using rope with knots tied at regular intervals. Similar scenes can be found in the tombs of Amenhotep-Sesi, Khaemhat and Djeserkareseneb. The balls of rope are also shown in New Kingdom statues of officials such as Senenmut, Amenemhet-Surer, and Penanhor.

Area
Records of land area also date to the Early Dynastic Period. The Palermo stone records grants of land expressed in terms of kha and setat. Mathematical papyri also include units of land area in their problems. For example, several problems in the Moscow Mathematical Papyrus give the area of rectangular plots of land in terms of setat and the ratio of the sides and then require the scribe to solve for their exact lengths.

The setat was the basic unit of land measure and may originally have varied in size across Egypt's nomes. Later, it was equal to one square khet, where a khet measured 100 cubits. The setat could be divided into strips one khet long and ten cubit wide (a kha).

During the Old Kingdom:

During the Middle and New Kingdom, the "eighth", "fourth", "half", and "thousand" units were taken to refer to the setat rather than the cubit strip:

During the Ptolemaic period, the cubit strip square was surveyed using a length of 96 cubits rather than 100, although the aroura was still figured to compose 2,756.25m2. A 36squarecubit area was known as a kalamos and a 144squarecubit area as a hamma. The uncommon bikos may have been hammata or another name for the cubit strip. The Coptic shipa was a land unit of uncertain value, possibly derived from Nubia.

Volume

Units of volume appear in the mathematical papyri. For example, computing the volume of a circular granary in RMP42 involves cubic cubits, khar, heqats, and quadruple heqats. RMP80 divides heqats of grain into smaller henu.

The oipe was also formerly romanized as the apet.

Weight

Weights were measured in terms of deben. This unit would have been equivalent to 13.6 grams in the Old Kingdom and Middle Kingdom. During the New Kingdom however it was equivalent to 91 grams. For smaller amounts the qedet ( of a deben) and the shematy ( of a deben) were used.

The qedet or kedet is also often known as the kite, from the Coptic form of the same name ( or ). In 19th-century sources, the deben and qedet are often mistakenly transliterated as the uten and kat respectively, although this was corrected by the 20th century.

Time

The former annual flooding of the Nile organized prehistoric and ancient Egypt into three seasons: Akhet ("Flood"), Peret ("Growth"), and Shemu or Shomu ("Low Water" or "Harvest").

The Egyptian civil calendar in place by Dynasty V followed regnal eras resetting with the ascension of each new pharaoh. It was based on the solar year and apparently initiated during a heliacal rising of Sirius following a recognition of its rough correlation with the onset of the Nile flood. It followed none of these consistently, however. Its year was divided into 3 seasons, 12 months, 36 decans, or 360 days with another 5 epagomenal days—celebrated as the birthdays of five major gods but feared for their ill luck—added "upon the year". The Egyptian months were originally simply numbered within each season but, in later sources, they acquired names from the year's major festivals and the three decans of each one were distinguished as "first", "middle", and "last". It has been suggested that during the Nineteenth Dynasty and the Twentieth Dynasty the last two days of each decan were usually treated as a kind of weekend for the royal craftsmen, with royal artisans free from work. This scheme lacked any provision for leap year intercalation until the introduction of the Alexandrian calendar by Augustus in the 20sBC, causing it to slowly move through the Sothic cycle against the solar, Sothic, and Julian years. Dates were typically given in a YMD format.

The civil calendar was apparently preceded by an observational lunar calendar which was eventually made lunisolar and fixed to the civil calendar, probably in 357BC. The months of these calendars were known as "temple months" and used for liturgical purposes until the closing of Egypt's pagan temples under Theodosius I in the AD390s and the subsequent suppression of individual worship by his successors.

Smaller units of time were vague approximations for most of Egyptian history. Hours—known by a variant of the word for "stars"—were initially only demarcated at night and varied in length. They were measured using decan stars and by water clocks. Equal 24-part divisions of the day were only introduced in 127BC. Division of these hours into 60 equal minutes is attested in Ptolemy's 2nd-century works.

See also
 Egyptian hieroglyphics and Transliteration of Ancient Egyptian
 Ancient Egyptian mathematics and technology
 Egyptian calendar and astronomy
 Ancient Mesopotamian, Hebrew, Persian, Greek, Roman, and Byzantine units of measurement
 Modern Egyptian units of measurement & Metric system

Notes

References

Citations

Bibliography
 . 
 .
 .
 .
 , a review of Clagett's Ancient Egyptian Science, Vols. I & II.
 .
 . 
 .
 .
 .
 .
 .

External links
 Egyptian ceremonial ruler showing fingers, palms, hands, fists, feet, remen
 Cubit divided into fingers and hands
 Modern replica of Egyptian ruler
 Measuring length in Ancient Egypt Page by Digitalegypt (University College London).
 Irrational numbers and pyramids Article by Gay Robins and C.C.D. Shute
 Introduction to Egyptian Mathematics, with photographs of Maya's cubit rod from the Louvre and land surveying scenes from the tomb of Menna.

Currencies of ancient Africa
Obsolete units of measurement
Systems of units
Egyptian calendar
Ancient Egypt
sl:Stare uteži in mere#Egipčanski sistem